Gairo is a large town and an administrative ward in Gairo District in the Morogoro Region of  Tanzania, East Africa. The town is the administrative centre for Gairo District. It is located on the main Dodoma to Dar es Salaam road and is a transshipment point, as well as a shipping point for the agricultural products of the district. As of 2002, the town's population was 16,982,

As of 2002, the population of the ward was 35,638. Ethnically, the people are mostly Kaguru.

Notes

Populated places in Morogoro Region
Wards of Morogoro Region